Manderley is a fictional estate in Daphne du Maurier's 1938 novel Rebecca, owned by the character Maxim de Winter.

Located in southern England (often said to be Cornwall as this was where the author lived, and explicitly stated as such in the Hitchcock adaptation), Manderley is a typical country estate: it is filled with family heirlooms, is run by a large domestic staff and is open to the public on certain days.

In spite of the house's beauty, the main character, the unnamed narrator, who has become mistress of Manderley, senses an atmosphere of doom about it, due to the death of Max's first wife (the titular Rebecca), and it is hinted that Rebecca haunts the estate. 

Du Maurier's childhood visits to Milton Hall, Cambridgeshire, home of the Fitzwilliam family, influenced the descriptions of Manderley, especially the interior. She told the 10th Earl Fitzwilliam in a letter that when she wrote Rebecca 20 years later, the interior of Manderley was based on her recollection of the rooms and 'big house feel' of Milton in the First World War.  The adult du Maurier's Cornish home near Fowey, called Menabilly, was influential in her descriptions of the setting, though it was a much smaller house. Seven years after writing the novel, she leased the manor (1945–1967) from the Rashleigh family, who have owned it since the 16th century. Like Menabilly, Manderley could not be seen from the road.

In popular culture
Manderley appears in the film and television adaptations of the novel: the 1940 film by Alfred Hitchcock, the 1997 television series, and the 2020 film by Ben Wheatley.
As a result of the novel's popularity, the name "Manderley" became extremely popular as a name for ordinary houses. The Irish singer Enya renamed her Dublin castle Manderley Castle.
A "Manderley Castle" features in one of the Anno Dracula books by Kim Newman.
Danish film director Lars von Trier's 2005 film Manderlay is set in a country estate with a large domestic staff.
In Stephen King's 1998 novel, Bag of Bones, "Manderley" is a semi-isolated lake house in Maine, identified with Sara Laughs, in the dreams of the main character Mike Noonan.

References

England in fiction
Fictional buildings and structures originating in literature
Fictional elements introduced in 1938
Fictional houses
Rebecca (novel)